Fort-de-France  is a commune and the capital city of Martinique, an overseas department and region of France located in the Caribbean. It is also one of the major cities in the Caribbean.

History
In 1638, Jacques Dyel du Parquet (1606–1658), nephew of Pierre Belain d'Esnambuc and first governor of Martinique, decided to have Fort Saint Louis built to protect the city against enemy attacks. The fort was soon destroyed, and rebuilt in 1669, when Louis XIV appointed the Marquis of Baas as governor general. Under his orders and those of his successors, particularly the Count of Blénac, the fort was built with a Vauban design.

Originally named Fort-Royal, the administrative capital of Martinique was over-shadowed by Saint-Pierre, the oldest city in the island, which was renowned for its commercial and cultural vibrancy as "The Paris of the Caribbean".

The name of Fort-Royal was changed to a short-lived "Fort-La-Republique" during the French Revolution, and finally settled as Fort-de-France sometime in the 19th century. The old name of Fort-Royal is still used today familiarly in its Creole language form of "Foyal", with the inhabitants of the city being "Foyalais".

The city was captured by a British expedition which captured Martinique in 1762, but the island was returned to French control in the Treaty of Paris. In 1839, the city was struck by a minor earthquake, and in 1890 saw an outbreak of fire which razed part of the city. By the turn of the 20th century, however, Fort-de-France became economically important after the volcanic eruption of Mount Pelée destroyed the town of Saint-Pierre in 1902.

Until 1918, when its commercial growth began, Fort-de-France had an inadequate water supply, was partly surrounded by swamps, and was notorious for yellow fever. Now the swamps are drained to make room for extensive suburbs.

Geography

Fort-de-France, also known as the Fort of France, lies on Martinique's west coast at the northern entrance to the large Fort-de-France Bay, at the mouth of the Madame River. The city occupies a narrow plain between the hills and the sea but is accessible by road from all parts of the island.

Climate
Fort-de-France has a tropical rainforest climate (Köppen Af), characterised by very warm to hot and humid weather year-round. The wettest months are from July to November when hurricanes are a frequent threat, although substantial rainfall occurs in all months. The hottest month on average is September, and the coldest month on average is February.

Population

Naval Port

Fort Saint Louis in Fort-de-France is a French naval base, as is Dégrad des Cannes (French Guiana).

Government

As of 27 June 2021, the Mayor of Fort de France is Serge Letchimy replacing Alfred Marie-Jeanne as the new mayor of the capitol. With a participation rate of little over 44% the Letchimy Party Alians Matinik received 37,72% of the votes, whereas Marie Jeanna who came in a close second with Gran Sanblé Pou Matinik acquired 35,27% of the votes. The commune of Fort-de-France makes up Martinique's 3rd constituency for the National Assembly.

Main sights
In addition to Fort Saint Louis, there are three other forts:
 Fort Desaix
 Fort Tartenson
 Fort Gerbault

Other sites of interest include:

 Place de la Savane
 Schoelcher Library
 Jardin de Balata, a botanical garden
 Sacré-Cœur de Balata Church, a replica of the parisian Montmartre Church lodged on a cliff surrounded by tropical forest
 Fort-de-France Cathedral

A statue commemorating Martinique-born Empress Josephine, the wife of Napoleon, is in the gardens of La Savane. It was vandalized in the 1990s, presumably by individuals who blamed her for supporting the reestablishment of slavery on the island. They removed the head and splashed the body with red paint. It has been further vandalized and destroyed in 2020.

Transport
Martinique Aimé Césaire International Airport is located in a suburb outside Fort-de-France and is accessible via the A1 autoroute.

Notable people
Manon Tardon (1913-1989), Resistance fighter
Frantz Fanon (1925-1961), psychiatrist, political philosopher and revolutionary
Julienne Salvat (1932–2019), teacher, poet, femme de lettres, actress
Karine Jean-Pierre (born 1974), organizer, activist, White House Press Secretary (since 2022)

See also
 Communes of the Martinique department

References

External links

 Official website
 
 

 
Capitals in the Caribbean
Communes of Martinique
Martinique–Saint Lucia border crossings
Populated places in Martinique
Port cities in the Caribbean
Prefectures in France